A Queen Mary beer cocktail is a mixture of grenadine and beer, which is commonly garnished with maraschino cherries. It is typically served in beer glassware, leaving room for a generous amount of beer head which can take on a pink or cherry-like tone. This drink can be quite sweet, and is best enjoyed chilled.

History 
The Queen Mary originated in Canada in the early 2000s, and has since become popular in North America, Europe, and Australia as an alternative to a shandy.  The drink is reportedly named after Mary of Teck, Queen Consort to King George V of the United Kingdom and the British Dominions.

Preparation and serving 

A Queen Mary cocktail is made by pouring grenadine into a beer glass, to taste, followed by beer, leaving room at the top for a thick layer of pink-hued beer foam. Maraschino cherries are often dropped into the glass as a garnish, while drizzling syrup from the cherries onto the beer foam for additional sweetness and colour, as desired.

See also
Bloody Mary (cocktail)
Shirley Temple (drink)
Roy Rogers (drink)

References

External links 

Cocktails
Cocktails with beer
Cocktails with grenadine
Mixed drinks
Sweet cocktails
Two-ingredient cocktails